A foundation programme, foundation program, foundation year, foundation year programme or foundation year program is a one-year introductory course to a full multi-year degree curriculum offered by many universities in the Commonwealth and elsewhere. These programmes may be intended for students not yet in a degree program or may form part of a specific degree course. Some programmes are designed specifically for either domestic or international students.

United Kingdom

In the UK, foundation year programmes, also known as "year zero" or "gateway programmes", are designed to develop skills and subject-specific knowledge to ensure a student to advance to a degree course. They may be offered as stand-alone one-year courses or integrated into degree programmes. Some programmes are for students who have not received suitable grades at A Level or IB while others are aimed at students who did not have the opportunity to take such qualifications.  foundation year programmes were available at 122 institutions through UCAS.

Lady Margaret Hall, Oxford offers a foundation year exclusively to students from poor socio-economic backgrounds. This aims to help them overcome disadvantages that would hinder their application process to the university.

For international students, Study Group offers international foundation year programmes in conjunction with a number of British universities including Aberdeen, Cardiff, Durham, Huddersfield, Kingston, Lancaster, Leeds and Leeds Beckett (jointly as Leeds International Study Centre), Liverpool John Moores, Royal Holloway, Sheffield, Strathclyde, Surrey, Sussex, and Teesside. Some universities offer their own international foundation programmes, including Warwick (since 1983) and SOAS University of London, specifically for students who do not speak English as a first language (since 1985). UCL has offered Undergraduate Preparatory Certificate international foundation year courses since 1991.

Elsewhere in the world

At Boston University, United States, the SABIC Foundation Year Program is a university preparation course aimed specifically at Saudi students.

At Salem Kolleg by Lake Constance, Germany, Kolleg students are introduced to many different university courses over a period of three terms as part of their studium generale program.

At Jacobs University in Germany, the Foundation Year Programme is a preparatory year.

At Karlshochschule International University in Germany, the Foundation Year Programme (Studienkolleg) is a preparatory year for international students.

At the University of King's College, Canada, their Foundation Year Program is a historical survey of western culture for first-year students.

At Maastricht University, the Netherlands, the Foundation Programme trains motivated international students to make them eligible (to apply) for a bachelor's programme at Maastricht University.

At the University of Queensland, the Foundation Year Programme is a university preparation program for students who are not citizens or permanent residents of Australia.

At Vanderbilt University, the Foundation Year Programme aims to prepare students from outside the United States to enter the American university system.

References 

Curricula